Magnificent Bodyguards  is a 1978 Hong Kong martial arts action film starring Jackie Chan and directed by Lo Wei. Chan, along with Luk Chuen also worked as stunt coordinators. This film was well received in Hong Kong, but Chan himself doesn't like it. He puts it down to Lo Wei not giving him any creative freedom. This was the first film in Hong Kong to be filmed using 3-D technology, and it features music from Star Wars.

Plot
Lord Ting Chung is hired to escort a woman's sick brother to the doctor, but he does it for free. To get there they must pass through "Stormy Hills", an area of Ancient China controlled by criminals. Then the sick man turns out to be the king of the criminals and is not really sick; he is just trying to reclaim his throne from an imposter. The king had previously murdered Ting Chung's father, and now Ting Chung has to fight for his life to get out and also to avenge his father.

Cast
 Jackie Chan as Lord Ting Chung
 James Tien as Tsang / Chang Wu-yi
 Leung Siu-lung as Chang 
 Wang Ping as Lady Nan
 Lau Ming as Old Lady of Ma Por Inn
 Lee Man-tai as Bearded Shaolin Abbot
 Luk Chuen as King
 Fang Fang as Liu Chin-lien
 Ko Keung as Wen Liang-yu

Home media
 The Japanese Laserdisc is said to be the only version containing the 3D version, though the only audio language option is Japanese and it is missing 10 minutes of footage.
 On 22 March 2002, Eastern Heroes released it on DVD cropped from 2:35:1 to 1:78:1 and an English dub (edited to remove Star Wars music) with no other language options.
 On 28 October 2005, Universal Japan released their DVD in 2:35:1. However, it has no English subtitles.
 On 5 March 2007, Hong Kong Legends released their DVD in 2:35:1 in Cantonese with newly translated English subtitles. However, the Cantonese "mono" is a downmix from the 5.1 remix. Mandarin is the correct language.
 In 2010, Fortune Star/Shout Factory released the film as part of the "Jackie Chan Eight Film Collection" DVD set. It is in 2:35:1, features the mono English dub, as well as the Star Wars music cues edited out of other versions.

See also
 Jackie Chan filmography
 List of Hong Kong films

References

External links

1978 films
1978 martial arts films
1978 action films
1970s 3D films
Films directed by Lo Wei
Hong Kong 3D films
Hong Kong action films
Hong Kong martial arts films
Kung fu films
1970s Mandarin-language films
1970s Hong Kong films